Simply Self Storage is a privately owned self-storage company in the United States. Simply Self Storage has over 8 million square feet of storage space with over 100 operating self-storage facilities.

Simply Self Storage is headquartered in Orlando, Florida and has self-storage facilities in Alabama, California, Florida, Georgia, Illinois, Indiana, Kansas, Louisiana, Maryland, Massachusetts, Michigan, Minnesota, Mississippi, Missouri, New York, Ohio, Oklahoma, Pennsylvania, Rhode Island, Tennessee, Texas, Virginia, and Washington.

In January 2016, Brookfield Asset Management announced purchasing Simply Self Storage from Tavistock. It was not disclosed how much money Tavistock may have lost as investors in the company.

In July 2018, Brookfield announced shrinking the Simply Self Storage portfolio by 112 properties when those sites were sold to a joint venture involving National Storage Affiliates.

In December 2020, Blackstone purchased what was remaining of the Simply Self Storage properties from Brookfield. No information was given regarding plans for the platform or retention of management team. Brookfield did not disclose any other holdings in the self storage sector.

References

External links

Companies based in Orlando, Florida
Storage companies
Privately held companies based in Florida
American companies established in 2003
2003 establishments in Florida